The Chiuzbaia is a right tributary of the river Săsar in Romania. It flows into the Săsar in Baia Sprie.

References

Rivers of Romania
Rivers of Maramureș County